Cavour usually refers to Camillo Benso, Count of Cavour (1810–1861), Italian politician who was a leading figure in the unification of Italy and became Italy's first Prime Minister.

It may also refer to:

Places

Italy 
 Cavour, Piedmont
 Cavour (Rome Metro)
 Ponte Cavour, a bridge in Rome
 Via Cavour (disambiguation), a street in Rome and Florence

United States 
 Cavour, South Dakota
 Cavour, Wisconsin
 Louis Cavour

Ships
 Italian aircraft carrier Cavour (550)
 Italian battleship Conte di Cavour

Other uses
 Liceo classico Cavour, a school in Turin
 Cavor, a character in the novel The First Men in the Moon